Hridaypur is a locality in Barasat of North 24 Parganas district in the Indian state of West Bengal. It is close to Kolkata and also a part of the area covered by Kolkata Metropolitan Development Authority (KMDA).

Geography
The rail-line bisects the area in 2 zones:
 West Hridaypur
 East Hridaypur

The Eastern part extends to National Highway 12. The western part is larger. West Hridaypur lacks any defined boundary. The western part of Hridaypur also connects to Madhyamgram Sajirhat via Kora Badamtola.

Hridaypur is notable for the Pranavananda Matri Ashram which is an orphanage for girls following the ideals and teachings of Swami Pranavananda, the founder of Bharat Sevashram Sangha. The ashram also houses a school where a large number of children of the local area study.

Transportation
The National Highway 12 (Jessore Road) runs through the east of Hridaypur. There is a bus stop named Hridaypur More, near Dakbungalow More at the point where the Hridaypur Station Road meets the Jessore Road. Hridaypur railway station, which belongs to the Sealdah–Hasnabad–Bangaon–Ranaghat line serves the area.

Schools in Hridaypur
 West Hridaypur Pranavananda Vidya Mandir for Girls (H.S)
 Manabata Sikshayatan High School
 Udayrajpur Hariharpur High School (H.S)
 Udayrajpur Hariharpur Girls' High School (H.S)

Colleges in Hridaypur
 BCDA College of Pharmacy and Technology
 SM's College of Management and Technology
 Sikkim Manipal University

Healthcare

 Narayana Multi-specialty Hospital
 Renuka Eye Institute
 Sri Krishna Medical

North 24 Parganas district has been identified as one of the areas where ground water is affected by arsenic contamination.

References

External links

Cities and towns in North 24 Parganas district
Neighbourhoods in North 24 Parganas district
Neighbourhoods in Kolkata
Kolkata Metropolitan Area